Park Sang-ha (Hangul: 박상하; born 4 April 1986 in Jecheon, Chungcheongbuk-do) is a South Korean volleyball player. He currently plays as a middle blocker for the Daejeon Samsung Fire Bluefangs.

Career

Clubs
Park was selected fifth overall by the Woori Capital Dream Six in the 2008 V-League Draft.

Park began his club career as the opposite spiker when 6' 6" (1.98 m) setter Vlado Petković played in the team. Park converted his position to middle blocker as Petković left the team after the 2009–10 season.

After the 2016–17 season, Park was signed with the Samsung Fire Bluefangs as a free agent.

National team
As a senior at Kyung Hee University in 2008, Park was first selected for the South Korean senior national team to compete at the 2008 FIVB World League.

External links
 FIVB biography at FIVB.org 
 Profile at FIVB.org

1986 births
Living people
South Korean men's volleyball players
Asian Games medalists in volleyball
Volleyball players at the 2014 Asian Games
Kyung Hee University alumni
Medalists at the 2014 Asian Games
Asian Games bronze medalists for South Korea
People from Jecheon
21st-century South Korean people